Qarabagh  is a town located in Afghanistan. It is the administrative center of  Qarabagh District, Ghazni Province. Also a district in Kabul is named Qarabagh too.

See also
 Qarabagh District
 Ghazni Province

References

Populated places in Ghazni Province